The following are the Iran men's national volleyball team results at FIVB sanctioned tournaments such as Olympic Games, World Championship, World Cup, World Grand Champions Cup and Nations League (formerly World League).

Olympic Games

2016

2020

World Championship

1970

1998

2006

2010

2014

2018

2022

World Cup

1991

2011

2015

2019

World Grand Champions Cup

2009

2013

2017

World League

2013

2014

2015

2016

2017

Nations League

2018

2019

2021

2022

2023

References

External links
Islamic Republic of Iran Volleyball Federation

National, Men's